Albania participated in the Eurovision Song Contest 2008 in Belgrade, Serbia, with the song "Zemrën e lamë peng" performed by Olta Boka. Its selected entry was chosen through the national selection competition Festivali i Këngës organised by Radio Televizioni Shqiptar (RTSH) in December 2007. Due to the introduction of two semi-finals, Albania was drawn to compete in the second semi-final of the contest, which took place on 22 May 2008. Performing as number six, the nation was announced among the top 10 entries of the second semi-final and therefore qualified to compete in the grand final. In the final on 24 May 2008, it performed as number three and placed 17th out of the 25 participating countries, scoring 55 points.

Background 

The nation's highest placing in the contest, to this point, had been the seventh place, which it achieved in 2004 with the song "The Image of You" performed by Anjeza Shahini. Albania's national broadcaster, Radio Televizioni Shqiptar (RTSH), has organised Festivali i Këngës since its inauguration in 1962. Since 2003, the winner of the competition has simultaneously won the right to represent Albania in the Eurovision Song Contest.

Before Eurovision

Festivali i Këngës 

RTSH organised the 46th edition of Festivali i Këngës to determine Albania's representative for the Eurovision Song Contest 2008. The competition consisted of two semi-finals on 14 and 15 December, respectively, and the grand final on 16 December 2007. The three live shows were hosted by Albanian singer Elsa Lila and composer Pirro Çako.

Competing entries

Shows

Semi-finals 

The semi-finals of Festivali i Këngës took place on 14 December and 15 December 2007, respectively. The first semi-final featured a guest performance from Albanian rock band Elita 5. 15 contestants participated in the first semi-final and 14 in the second, with the highlighted ones progressing to the grand final.

Final 

The grand final of Festivali i Këngës took place on 16 December 2007. The winner was determined by the combination of the votes from a seven-member jury, consisting of Agim Krajka, David Tukiqi, Gjergj Leka, Gjergj Xhuvani, Rudina Magjistari, Baton Haxhia and Alban Skenderi. Guest performances were featured from Italian a cappella group Neri per Caso and Swedish musical group Rednex. Olta Boka emerged as the winner with "Zemrën e lamë peng" and was simultaneously announced as Albania's representative for the Eurovision Song Contest 2008.

At Eurovision 

The Eurovision Song Contest 2008 took place at the Belgrade Arena in Belgrade, Serbia and consisted of two semi-finals held on 20 and 22 May, respectively, and the grand final on 24 May 2008.

With the introduction of two semi-finals for the Eurovision Song Contest, Albania was required to compete in one of the two. On 28 January 2008, a special allocation draw was held that placed each country into one of the two semi-finals, with Albania being placed into the second, to be held on 22 May. Once all the competing songs for the 2008 contest had been released, the running order for the semi-finals was decided by the delegation heads of the 43 participating countries of the contest rather than through another draw; the nation was set to perform at position 6, following  and preceding .

Voting 

The tables below visualise a breakdown of points awarded to Albania in the second semi-final and grand final of the Eurovision Song Contest 2008, as well as by the nation on both occasions.

Points awarded to Albania

Points awarded by Albania

References 

2008
Countries in the Eurovision Song Contest 2008
2007
Eurovision
Eurovision